The 1973 Boston College Eagles football team represented Boston College as an independent during the 1973 NCAA Division I football season. Led by sxith-year head coach Joe Yukica, the Eagles compiled a record of 7–4. Boston College played home games at Alumni Stadium in Chestnut Hill, Massachusetts.

Schedule

Roster

References

Boston College
Boston College Eagles football seasons
Boston College Eagles football
Boston College Eagles football